Catherine Carolina Barriga Guerra (born 8 April 1973) is a Chilean politician who served as mayor of Maipú.

References

External links
 

Living people
21st-century Chilean politicians
21st-century Chilean women politicians
Independent Democratic Union politicians
Santo Tomás University alumni
1973 births
Chilean television personalities